The Batik Painting Museum Penang is a museum about batik in George Town, Penang, Malaysia.

History
The building was purchased in 2010 and underwent a three-year renovation before it was opened on 1 October 2013.

Architecture
The museum is located in a three-story Straits eclectic-style shop house with a total area of 650 m2.

Exhibition
There are around 80 batik paintings being exhibited in the museum.
The Museum showcases the earliest batik paintings done in the 1950s by the 'Father of Batik Painting' Chuah Thean Teng in Penang and the subsequent works by other Malaysian artists. Currently there are now 80 batik paintings by 25 artists in display. A small international section is included. Visitors will be able to view an excellent collection of magnificent batik paintings not to be seen anywhere else. This is definitely the only batik painting museum in Malaysia, and possibly in the world.

See also
 List of museums in Malaysia

References

2013 establishments in Malaysia
Buildings and structures in George Town, Penang
Historic house museums in Malaysia
Museums in Penang
Tourist attractions in George Town, Penang
Batik